Bryan Davies may refer to:

 Bryan Davies, Baron Davies of Oldham (born 1939), Labour member of the House of Lords
 Bryan Davies (singer) (born 1944), Australian singer and actor

See also
Brian Davies (disambiguation)
Bryan Davis (disambiguation)